Major-General Gerald Harry George Lloyd-Verney DSO & Bar MVO (10 July 1900 – 3 April 1957) was a senior British Army officer who commanded the 7th Armoured Division ("The Desert Rats") during World War II. He changed his name by Deed poll from Gerald Lloyd Verney to Gerald Lloyd-Verney in 1941.

Early life
He was the son of Sir Harry Lloyd Verney and Lady Joan Elizabeth Mary Cuffe. Educated at Eton College, Verney was Page of Honour to King George V between 1914 and 1917.

Military career
He was commissioned into the Grenadier Guards in 1919. He became Aide-de-camp to the Governor of South Australia in 1928 and then, after attending the Staff College, Camberley from 1938 to 1939, transferred to the Irish Guards in 1939.

He served in World War II as instructor at the Staff College in 1940 before becoming Commanding Officer of 2nd Bn Irish Guards during their conversion to tanks in the UK later that year. He was appointed Commander of 32nd Guards Brigade in the UK in 1942, Commander of 6th Guards Tank Brigade in the UK (before being deployed to Normandy) in January 1943 and General Officer Commanding 7th Armoured Division in North West Europe in August 1944. He was personally appointed by Bernard Montgomery to the 7th Armoured Division. He went on to be Commander of 1st Guards Brigade in Italy and Austria from 1944 to 1945 when he became Military Commander in Vienna.

His last appointment was as General Officer Commanding 56th (London) Armoured Division in 1946 before retiring in 1948.

Personal life
In 1926 he married the Hon Joyce Sybil Vivian Smith, daughter of Vivian Smith, 1st Baron Bicester and together they had two children:

 Major Peter Vivian Lloyd-Verney, an Irish Guards officer who married first Caroline Evelyn Harford daughter of George Anthony Harford, descendant of John Scandrett Harford of Blaise Castle, and Margaret Hotham Admiral Sir Charles Frederick Hotham. They had three children together and divorced in 1982. He then married Elizabeth Anne Burke in 1983 daughter of Wing Commander Harry St. George Burke, of the Burkes of Clondagoff Castle, County Galway, and Evelyn Marjorie Stringer. (19 December 1930 - 12 October 2019).
 Bridget Mary Lloyd-Verney who married Michael Barry Sarson, son of Captain Maurice John Sarson, on 20 October 1951 and had four children.

Lloyd-Verney died on 3 April 1957 at Enniskerry, Ireland, aged 56.

References

External links
Generals of World War II

|-

1900 births
1957 deaths
British Army generals of World War II
Companions of the Distinguished Service Order
Graduates of the Royal Military College, Sandhurst
Graduates of the Staff College, Camberley
Grenadier Guards officers
Irish Guards officers
Members of the Royal Victorian Order
People educated at Eton College
Military personnel from London
British Army major generals
People from Kensington
War Office personnel in World War II
British Army brigadiers of World War II
Academics of the Staff College, Camberley